Charles Percy Babington (May 4, 1895 – March 22, 1957) was a  Major League Baseball center fielder who played for the New York Giants in .

External links

1895 births
1957 deaths
New York Giants (NL) players
Baseball players from Rhode Island